Parkton Hotel is a historic hotel located at Parkton, Baltimore County, Maryland, United States. It is a -story brick structure, five bays wide by three bays deep, constructed between 1850 and 1860. The hotel features a two-tiered, shed-roofed gallery which wraps around the south gable end. A two-story, two-bay, shed-roofed frame addition dating from 1884 extends to the rear of the brick block.

The Parkton Hotel was listed on the National Register of Historic Places in 1983.

References

External links
, including photo from 1980, at Maryland Historical Trust

Hotels in Maryland
Buildings and structures in Baltimore County, Maryland
Hotel buildings on the National Register of Historic Places in Maryland
Hotel buildings completed in 1860
National Register of Historic Places in Baltimore County, Maryland